The Stepping Stone is a 1916 American silent drama film, directed by Reginald Barker and Thomas H. Ince. It is a lost film.

Plot
Mary Beresford (Boland) is the wife of unambitious law clerk Al Beresford (Beresford). Thanks to Mary's tenacity and carefully calculated social-climbing, Al is promoted to the position of personal secretary of prominent financier Elihu Knowland (Keenan). Unfortunately, success goes to Al's head like a narcotic, and soon he has alienated everyone in New York, including Mary, who runs off for parts unknown.

Cast
 Frank Keenan as Elihu Knowland
 Mary Boland as Mary Beresford
 Robert McKim	as Al Beresford
 Margaret Thompson as Flora Alden
 Joseph J. Dowling as W. B. Prescott
 J. Barney Sherry as Horatio Wells

References

External links

1916 films
American black-and-white films
American silent feature films
1916 drama films
Films directed by Thomas H. Ince
Lost American films
Silent American drama films
Triangle Film Corporation films
1916 lost films
Lost drama films
1910s American films
1910s English-language films